RedeTV! is a Brazilian television network owned by Amilcare Dallevo and Marcelo de Carvalho. It is the newest television network, among the five major networks in Brazil, being a relaunch of Rede Manchete in 1999.

RedeTV! has modern production plants, located in São Paulo, Rio de Janeiro, Belo Horizonte, Recife and Fortaleza. RedeTV! is headquartered in the CTD - Centro de Televisão Digital (Digital Television Center, in English), located in Osasco, a suburb of São Paulo, where its news division is based. It was the first network worldwide to be broadcast in 3D.

With a market share of 0.7 points in 2018, it has the smallest market share out of the top five Brazilian TV networks.

History
On May 8, 1999, two days before Rede Manchete ceased operations, its license was sold to TeleTV Group. RedeTV! would begin test broadcasts later that month as TV!, and temporarily aired several of Rede Manchete's programs and a modified version of its daily newscast. On November 12, 1999, the network's test broadcasts were replaced with a countdown clock to its official launch. RedeTV! officially commenced broadcasting at 7:00 am on November 15, 1999.

RedeTV!'s principal shows are Encrenca, the program of greater audience of the transmitter, A Tarde é Sua, an afternoon variety show hosted by Sônia Abrão, Superpop, an entertainment program and TV Fama, a program about celebrities. It was responsible for the Brazilian version of Desperate Housewives, Donas de Casa Desesperadas, series exhibited in 2007. The TV programming is directed mostly to the entertainment, with comedy, talk shows, soap operas, audience shows, journalism, sports, TV series and feminine showbiz.

RedeTV! was the first Brazilian network to produce all of its original programming in high definition.

In September 2009, RedeTV! changed its facilities Barueri for the Centro de Televisão Digital (CTD) in Osasco (São Paulo). Despite having changed its headquarters to the Centro de Televisão Digital (CTD) in September, the official inauguration of the center was on the 13th of November, being celebrated with a big party and with the participation of politicians, businessmen and artists such as Luciana Gimenez, Iris Stefanelli and Supla, in addition to President Luiz Inácio Lula da Silva.

In May 2010, Pânico na TV became the first show in the world to do a live 3D transmission in a free-to-pay channel.

In 2011, when the TeleTV Group was closed, the management and ownership of RedeTV! was transferred to Amilcare Dallevo Jr. and Marcelo de Carvalho, which is now owned by their own groups.

Centers and affiliates
RedeTV! has five stations owned and 32 affiliated stations throughout Brazil, totaling 37 stations that rebroadcast the signal from it.

Osasco (São Paulo) - Channel 29

Rio de Janeiro (Rio de Janeiro) - Channel 21

Belo Horizonte (Minas Gerais) - Channel 25

Recife (Pernambuco) - Channel 19

Fortaleza (Ceará) - Channel 34

Affiliates stations

Acre
 ABC TV - Rio Branco - Channel 40

Amapá
 TV Tucuju - Macapá - Channel 24

Amazonas
 Inova TV - Manaus - Channel 18

Distrito Federal
 TV Brasília - Brasília - Channel 6

Espírito Santo
 RedeTV! ES - Vila Velha - Channel 18

Maranhão
 TV Guanaré - Caxias - Channel 10
 TV Clube - Açailândia - Channel 13
 TV São Luís - São Luís - Channel 8

Mato Grosso
 TV Pantanal - Cuiabá - Channel 22
 Gente TV - Sinop - Channel 2
 TV Migrantes - Guarantã do Norte - Channel 3
 TV Terra - Lucas do Rio Verde - Channel 8
 TV Pantaneira - Poconé - Channel 11
 TV Portal da Amazônia - Pontes e Lacerda - Channel 12

Pará
 TV Livre - Belém/Marabá - Channel 47/38
 Amazônia TV - Parauapebas - Channel 4
 TV Atalaia - Óbidos - Channel 10

Paraíba
 TV Arapuan - João Pessoa/Campina Grande - Channel 14/11

Paraná
 Tenda TV - Arapongas - Channel 2
 TV Sudoeste - Pato Branco - Channel 7

Piauí
 O Dia TV - Teresina - Channel 23

Rio Grande do Sul
 TV Pampa - Porto Alegre - Channel 4
 TV Pampa - Santa Maria - Channel 4
 TV Pampa - Carazinho - Channel 9
 TV Pampa - Pelotas - Channel 13

Rondônia
 RedeTV! Rondônia - Porto Velho - Channel 17
 KTV - Cacoal - Channel 15

Roraima
 TV Boa Vista - Boa Vista - Channel 12

Santa Catarina
 TV Araucária - Lages - Channel 13

Tocantins
 TV Líder - Araguaína - Channel 20
 RedeTV! Tocantins - Palmas - Channel 29

Network slogans
1999-2000: Uma opção de qualidade na sua TV. (A quality option in your TV.)
2000-2001: A nova rede de TV do Brasil. (The new TV network in Brazil.)
2001-2008, 2017-2019: A Rede de TV que mais cresce no Brasil. (Brazil's fastest growing TV network.)
2008-2009: Quem vê, já sabe. (Who watches it, already knows it.)
2009-2017 : Em rede com você. (In network with you.)
2011: Primeira em tecnologia HD 3D. (First in HD-3D technology.)
2019–present: Evoluindo com você (Evolving with you.)

RedeTV! shows

 O Céu é o Limite (L'eredità)
 Mega Senha (Million Dollar Password)
 Conexão Models
 Operação de Risco
 Entubados (2018)
 Dr. Hollywood (Dr. 90210)
 TV Fama (Entertainment Tonight)
 Operação Cupido (Game Show)
 Shark Tank Brasil (Dragons' Den)
 A Melhor Viagem (Game Show) (2019-2020)
 Chega Mais (Game Show) (2015)
 Sob Medida (2013-2015)
 The Bachelor Brasil (The Bachelor) (2014)
 Estação Teen (2012)
 Saturday Night Live Brasil (Saturday Night Live) (2012)
 Sexo a 3 (2012)
 O Último Passageiro (The Last Passenger/All or nothing) (2010-2013)
 Pânico na TV (Jackass) (2003-2012)
 Taxi do Milão (Cash Cab) (2010)
 Receita Pop (Ready Steady Cook) (2010)
 The Amazing Race: A Corrida Milionária (The Amazing Race) (2007-2008)
 Clube das Mulheres (2008)
 Donas de Casa Desesperadas (Desperate Housewives) (2007-2008)
 GAS Sound (2007-2008)
 Insomnia (2004-2007)
 Apartamento das Modelos (2002)
 Interligado Games (Game Show) (2003-2011)
 Interligado (1999-2003)
 National Football League (2022-)
 Liga Brasileira de Free Fire (E-Sports)

Presenters

News  

 Franz Vacek
 Augusto Xavier
 Amanda Klein
 Gabriela Di França
 Joice Mafezzolli
 Kennedy Alencar
 Sikêra Jr
 Jorge Lordello
 Edie Polo

Sports  

 Silvio Luiz
 Marcelo do Ó
 Fernando Fontana
 Napoleão de Almeida
 Gabriel Golim
 Pathy dos Reis
 André Vasco
 Fernanda Keulla
 Edílson

Entertainment  

 João Kleber
 Luciana Gimenez
 Daniela Alburquerque
 Marcelo de Carvalho
 Ronnie Von
 Claudete Troiano
 Sonia Abrão

See also  
 Rede Manchete

References

External links
  

 
Companies based in São Paulo (state)
Portuguese-language television networks
Television networks in Brazil
Television channels and stations established in 1999
3D television channels
1999 establishments in Brazil